The Stebbins system is an angiosperm plants classification drawn up by the American botanist G. Ledyard Stebbins (1906–2000). The system was published in the book Flowering plants: evolution above the species level (1974), and was followed by Vernon Heywood (b. 1927) in his Flowering plants of the world (1978).

Classification  

Flowering plants
 Dicotyledons
 Magnoliidae
 Hamamelidae
 Caryophyllidae
 Dilleniidae
 Rosidae
 Asteridae
 Monocotyledons
 Alismatidae
 Commelinidae
 Arecidae
 Liliidae

References 

system, Stebbins